This is a list of holidays in Wallis and Futuna.

List

References

Wallis
Wallis and Futuna